Fortune was a Hansa A Type cargo ship which was built as Weserstrom in 1944 by J Cockerill SA, Antwerp, Belgium for Norddeutscher Lloyd, Bremen, Germany. She was seized as a prize of war in 1945, passing to the Ministry of War Transport and renamed Empire Galena. She was sold in 1947 and was renamed Albatross. She was sold in 1958 to South Africa and renamed Port Capetown. A further sale in 1959 saw her renamed Frontier. She was sold to Hong Kong in 1966 and was renamed Fortune. She served until 1968 when she was scrapped.

Description

The ship was propelled by a compound steam engine, which had two cylinders of 42 cm (16 inches) and two cylinders of 90 cm (35 inches) diameter by 90 cm (35 inches) stroke. The engine was built by Rheinmetall-Borsig AG, Berlin.

History
Weserstrom was a Hansa A Type cargo ship built in 1943 as yard number 701 by J Cockerill SA, Antwerp, Belgium for Norddeutscher Lloyd, Bremen, Germany. She was completed in January 1944. Her port of registry was Bremen.

In May 1945, Weserstrom was seized as a prize of war at Kiel. She was passed to the Ministry of War Transport. She was renamed Empire Galena. The Code Letters GJGL and United Kingdom Official Number 180597 were allocated. Her port of registry was London and she was operated under the management of W Tulley & Co. Ltd., Hull.

On 6 March 1947, Empire Galena was sold to the General Steam Navigation Co Ltd. She was renamed Albatross on 30 July.

On 2 April 1958, Albatross was sold for £51,500 to the National Shipping Lines of South Africa and was renamed Port Capetown.. She was sold in 1959 to African Coasters (Pty) Ltd, Durban and renamed Frontier. With their introduction in the 1960s, Frontier was allocated the IMO Number 5121990.

In 1966, Frontier was sold to Summit Navigation Co., Panama and was renamed Fortune. She was operated under the management of Mollers Ltd, Hong Kong. She served until 1968 and was scrapped at Hong Kong in December.

References

1943 ships
Ships built in Belgium
World War II merchant ships of Germany
Steamships of Germany
Ships of Norddeutscher Lloyd
Empire ships
Ministry of War Transport ships
Merchant ships of the United Kingdom
Steamships of the United Kingdom
Merchant ships of South Africa
Steamships of South Africa
Merchant ships of Panama
Steamships of Panama